Calafia is an album by Gerald Wilson's Orchestra of the 80's recorded in 1984 and released on the Trend label.

Reception

AllMusic rated the album with 4 stars; in his review, Scott Yanow noted: "Gerald Wilson's big band recordings were always quite consistent, featuring his distinctive arrangements and some of Los Angeles' top hard bop soloists of the era... A fine, underrated effort".

Track listing 
All compositions by Gerald Wilson.
 "Prince Albert" - 6:08
 "Calafia" - 5:20
 "Eloy" - 5:49
 "The Redd Foxx" - 4:38
 "3/4 for Mayor Tom" - 6:58
 "Viva Tirado '85" - 9:17

Personnel 
Gerald Wilson - arranger, conductor
Al Aarons, Rick Baptist, Oscar Brashear, Snooky Young -trumpet  
Garnett Brown, Buster Cooper, Thurman Green, Maurice Spears - trombone 
Red Callender - tuba
Roger Hogan, Harold Land, Anthony Ortega, John Stephens, Henry de Vega, Ernie Watts - saxophones
Milcho Leviev - piano
Stanley Gilbert - bass 
Paul Humphrey - drums

References 

Gerald Wilson albums
1985 albums
Albums arranged by Gerald Wilson
Albums conducted by Gerald Wilson